Sriman is an epithet of the Hindu deity Vishnu. It refers to the deity being the possessor of Sri, both referring to his consort Lakshmi, the goddess of prosperity, as well as the material and non material aspects of fortune.

Literature 
Sriman is a name of Vishnu, and appears as the 22nd, 178th, and the 220th names in the Vishnu Sahasranama.

According to Adi Shankara's commentary on the Vishnu Sahasranama, Sriman means "One on whose chest Sri or Lakshmi, mother of the world, always dwells."

Shriman Narayana is often used to invoke Vishnu in the mantrams of Vedanta Desika.

References 

Vaishnavism
Names of Vishnu